Fuchinoo Dam (Re) is a concrete gravity dam located in Saga Prefecture in Japan. The dam is used for water supply. The catchment area of the dam is 21.9 km2. The dam impounds about 7 ha of land when full and can store 585 thousand cubic meters of water. The construction of the dam was started on 1979 and completed in 1980.

References

Dams in Saga Prefecture
1980 establishments in Japan